Ritual of Infinity is the first studio album by American death metal band Morpheus Descends. It was released in late 1992 through JL America. The album was reissued on compact disc in 2005 through Spanish independent label Xtreem Music along with the entire Adipocere extended play. The Crypt reissued the album (along with the rest of the band's discography) on vinyl for the first time on black, blue, and clear vinyl in 2015. It is the first album by the group to feature vocalist Jeff Riemer as well as their last to include guitarist Steve Hanson.

Background and recording
Tracks from the album were recorded during three separate sessions at Legend Studios, New York in January, April, and September 1992. The tracks "Trephanation" and "Accelerated Decrepitude" are re-recordings of tracks previously released on the Adipocere EP. The tracks "Corpse Under Glass", "Proclaimed Creator," and "Ritual of Infinity" were previously released as a three-track demo tape under the name Corpse Under Glass".

The cover art for the album was done by the artist Brad Moore--who became a fan of the band after he listened to the Corpse Under Glass demo and was asked by bassist Ken Faggio if he could do artwork for the album.

Release and reception
The album initially faced lukewarm reception upon its release. To support the album the band embarked upon a self-financed tour.

The album gets some moderate praise from critics today.  Death Metal Underground says that the album has "character and a constant sense of motion in structure that enables continuity to dissonant, postmodern, thunderous music" while also criticizing the album's mixing. Matt Smith of the heavy metal webzine Maelstrom states in his review of the 2005 Xtreem edition of the album: "Ritual of Infinity is a great example of early '90s New York death metal."

Track listing

Release history

Personnel
Adapted from the Ritual of Infinity'' liner notes.
Jeff Riemer – vocals
Rob Yench – guitar
Steve Hanson – guitar
Ken Faggio – bass
Sam Inzerra – drums, backing vocals ("Corpse Under Glass" and "Immortal Coil")
Bob Vandermark – production, engineering
Justin Hossman – engineering
Brad Moore - cover artwork

References

External links

1992 albums
Morpheus Descends albums